Human rights in Abkhazia are granted by Chapter II of its Constitution which makes reference to adherence of Abkhazia to UDHR, ICCPR and ICESCR (Article 11). However, Abkhazia is not a UN member state and is not a party of UN human rights treaties, unlike Georgia, whose sovereignty over Abkhazia is recognized by a bigger part of the international community.

Abkhazia was classified as partly free by the Freedom House, its 2009 report naming corruption, problems in the legal system and the unresolved Georgian refugee problem as the main human rights issues.

In the 1990s, ethnic cleansing of Georgians took place in Abkhazia; many ethnic Georgians remain displaced persons to this day.

Domestic and international institutions

A post of Human Rights Commissioner (as of 2008 — Gueorgui Otyrba) exists under the President of Abkhazia.

The UN Human Rights Office Abkhazia, Georgia (HROAG), was established in 1996 to protect and promote human rights there.

Media

There are several independent newspapers and one independent SOMA radio station; electronic media are partially controlled by the state.

On 21 September 2009 journalist Anton Krivenyuk was sentenced by the Sukhumi city court to a three-year suspended prison sentence for libel of president Sergei Bagapsh. On 8 June Krivenyuk had written an article for a Russian website which was widely republished in Abkhazian newspapers in which he criticised Bagapsh's decision to hand over control of the Abkhazian railway to Russia. Krivenyuk was the first journalist to be prosecuted in Abkhazia since the fall of the Soviet Union, and his conviction was seen by some other journalists as part of a government crack-down on independent media in the run-up to the December 2009 Abkhazian presidential election.

Constitution and ethnicity
The Constitution allows only to persons of Abkhaz ethnicity to be President of Abkhazia (Article 49; in the aforementioned translation words Abkhazian nationality are used, however, for citizens, another term is used — citizen of the Republic of Abkhazia, like in Article 38. Besides, in the Constitution's text in co-official Russian language word национальность clearly indicating ethnicity is used).

Literature

Marshania D. Z. Human and civil rights in the Republic of Abkhazia, 2008.

See also 
 LGBT rights in Abkhazia

References

External links
CoE Commissioner for Human Rights report
Freedom House report on Abkhazia

Law of Abkhazia
Abkhazia
Abkhazia
Politics of Abkhazia